Kontich (old spelling: Contich) is a municipality located in the Belgian province of Antwerp. The municipality comprises the towns of Kontich proper and Waarloos. In 2021, Kontich had a total population of 21,260. The total area is 23.67 km³.

Kontich exists of three parts: Kontich Centrum, Waarloos and Kontich Kazerne. Kontich Kazerne has a big industrial center and a train station on the line between Antwerp and Mechelen. The barracks (kazerne in Dutch) which gave the name to the settlement have closed however.

The Centrum part of Kontich has the town center.

The E19 highway between Antwerp and Brussels passes through Kontich.

"Kontich" comes from the Latin word condacum which means confluence of 2 streams.

Famous inhabitants 
 Marthe De Pillecyn, singer (b. 1996)
 Timo Descamps, actor (b. 1976)
 Martinus Dom, first abbot of the Trappist abbey of Westmalle (1791-1873)
 Benedict Neefs, Abbot of Hemiksem (1741-1790)
 Matz Sels, footballer (b. 1992)
 Albert Thys, painter (1894-1976)
 Yasmine, singer (1972-2009)
 Bart De Wever, politician (b. 1970)

Gallery

References

External links 
 
  

 
Municipalities of Antwerp Province
Populated places in Antwerp Province